Estadio Agustín "Coruco" Díaz is a football stadium named in honour of a local player named Agustín "Coruco" Díaz. It has a capacity of 16,000 seats and it was home to the team Cañeros de Zacatepec (Sugar cane growers) until 2020, when it was dissolved.

This stadium is one of the oldest in Mexico and its origins can be traced back to 1948. It is located in Zacatepec, Morelos. The official opening of this stadium was in November 1954. This stadium is nicknamed the Selva Cañera ("Sugar Cane Jungle") because of the tropical weather that distinguish the municipality of Zacatepec. There was a famous player and later coach named Ignacio Trelles, who ordered the watering of the field one hour before the football match, leading to a very strong vaporization and an increase of the  temperature to near 40 Celsius (more or less 100 Fahrenheit), which was very hard for the visitor squads. Another oddity of this building is that is it located in the center of the town of Zacatepec, beside the sugar cane refineries.

See also
List of football stadiums in Mexico

References

2. http://www.zacatepecsiglo21.com/

External links
stadium section of official Zacatepec website
/ Unofficial site of the Coruco Díaz Stadium

Sports venues in Morelos
Agustin Coruco Diaz
1964 establishments in Mexico
Sports venues completed in 1964